Thomas Hepburn (20 December 1839 – 22 April 1921) was an Australian cricketer. He played two first-class cricket matches for Victoria between 1872 and 1873.

See also
 List of Victoria first-class cricketers

References

External links
 

1839 births
1921 deaths
Australian cricketers
Victoria cricketers
Cricketers from Melbourne